Bathelium pruinosum is a species of corticolous (bark-dwelling) lichen in the family Trypetheliaceae. Found in Bolivia, it was formally described as a new species in 2016 by lichenologists Adam Flakus, Martin Kukwa, and André Aptroot. It contains lichexanthone, a lichen product that causes it to fluoresce yellow when lit with a long-wavelength UV light. The species epithet refers to the pruina on both the thallus and pseudostromata.

References

Trypetheliaceae
Lichen species
Lichens described in 2016
Lichens of Bolivia
Taxa named by André Aptroot
Taxa named by Adam Grzegorz Flakus